Appenzeller Kantonalbank is the cantonal bank of the Canton of Appenzell Innerrhoden. Its head office is situated at Appenzell.

80% of the bank's income comes from lending interests.

Presidents 

 2004-2015: Hanspeter Koller
 Since 2015: Roman Boutellier

See also
List of banks
List of banks in Switzerland

References

External links
Official website

Cantonal banks
1899 establishments in Switzerland
Banks established in 1899